Mattson Tomlin (born July 16, 1990) is a filmmaker and writer.

Career 
In 2018, Tomlin wrote the script for the Project Power (2020) for Netflix, starring Jamie Foxx, Joseph Gordon-Levitt, and Dominique Fishback. He scripted and produced the film Little Fish (2021), based on a short story by Aja Gabel. He gained attention in 2019 when he was brought onboard to assist with The Batman (2022). The film would serve as a reboot of the Batman film franchise and star Robert Pattinson.  The script which was completed in 2019 was submitted to Warner Bros by Matt Reeves written by Reeves, Tomlin and Peter Craig although only Reeves and Craig received credit.

By January 2020, Tomlin was writing the television pilot for an adaption of the comic book series Fear Agent, and a film adaption of the comic book series Memetic for Lionsgate. Both projects would be produced by Seth Rogen's Point Grey Pictures. He was also writing a film adaptation of the video game character Mega Man for Netflix. In May 2020, Tomlin sold a spec script, titled 2084, to Paramount Pictures. By September 2020, Tomlin wrote the script for Mother/Android, with the intention to direct. In February 2021, Tomlin was hired to write the screenplay for an anime series based on the Terminator franchise, to be produced by Netflix, Skydance, and Production I.G. In October 2021, Tomlin was writing the live-action film adaptation of BRZRKR. In 2021, Tomlin wrote the comic book series Batman: The Imposter for DC Comics, alongside artist Andrea Sorrentino and with variant covers by artist Lee Bermejo. In August 2022, it was announced Tomlin would co-write the sequel to The Batman with Matt Reeves. In September 2022, it was announced that Tomlin would write a three-issue maxiseries for Boom! Studios entitled A Vicious Circle, with Lee Bermejo serving as artist, and publication beginning in December 2022.

Bibliography 
 Batman: The Imposter (2021)
 A Vicious Circle (2022–23)

Filmography

Film

Television

References

External links 
 

1990 births
21st-century American male writers
21st-century American screenwriters
American film directors
American film producers
American male screenwriters
American male television writers
Film people from Bucharest
Living people